Linotype-Hell DaVinci was an image manipulation program targeted at the repro and print shop markets. It originally ran on proprietary hardware, but was later ported to Silicon Graphics workstations. The first version was released in 1993, and it continued to see regular releases until Heidelberg acquired Linotype-Hell in 1997. Heidelberg continued to update the software a few times before it was discontinued in April 2001, but the core engines for trapping and colour management were recoded to work on PDF files and were a key contributor to the commercial success of Prinergy, which benefitted from the Heidelberg-Creo joint venture.

Development

Hardware
DaVinci originally ran on proprietary "Power" workstations with dual 68040 or 88110 processors and several custom ASICs. Later it was ported to SGI IRIX based "Sprint" systems. Optional hardware included a high-speed FDDI interface and a second Ethernet controller.

The DaVinci name was the second choice during its development. Internally it was known as "Chagall", named after the artist. However, permission could not be obtained to use his name. In the early days of Photoshop and Apple Macintosh hardware, rotation and scaling of large digital images taxed those machines to the limit, often taking several minutes to complete. In a high-end colour shop the Davinci performed these manipulations and many others with ease and in seconds, especially on the proprietary hardware. It was also equipped with a calibrated colour monitor.

Release history

See also
Barco Creator
Barco ColorTone
Dalim Tango

IRIX software
Raster graphics editors
Technical communication tools